The men's team table tennis event was part of the table tennis programme and took place between 25 and 28 May, at the Waseda University Gymnasium.

Schedule
All times are Japan Standard Time (UTC+09:00)

Results

 Since both Republic of China and Iran were tied on points, a play-off match was played to decide the 3rd team.

References

 Official Report

External links
ITTF Database

Table tennis at the 1958 Asian Games